After the completed dissolution of Yugoslavia in 2006, the Serbian national football team did not qualify for the four UEFA European Championships it played qualifiers for. Its official predecessor teams Yugoslavia and FR Yugoslavia/Serbia & Montenegro were more successful; the team representing "larger" Yugoslavia became European vice-champions twice (in 1960 and 1968) while the union of Serbia and Montenegro (still named "Yugoslavia" until 2003) reached the quarter-finals at Euro 2000.

Overall record

List of matches

As Yugoslavia

1960 European Nations' Cup

Final tournament

Semi-finals

Final

Euro 1968

Final tournament

Semi-finals

Final

Original match

Replay

Euro 1976

Final tournament

Semi-finals

Third place play-off

Euro 1984

Group stage

As FR Yugoslavia

Euro 2000

Group stage

Knockout stage

Quarter-finals

References

 
Countries at the UEFA European Championship